Lou Monte (born Louis Scaglione; April 2, 1917 – June 12, 1989) was an Italian American singer best known for a number of best-selling, Italian-themed novelty records which he recorded for both RCA Victor and Reprise Records in the late 1950s and early 1960s, most famously "Lazy Mary" (1958) and the 1962/63 million-selling US single "Pepino the Italian Mouse", plus the seasonal track "Dominick the Donkey". He also recorded on Roulette Records, Jubilee Records, Regalia Records, Musicor Records, Laurie Records, and AFE Records.

Early life
Monte was born on April 2, 1917 in Manhattan to Italian immigrant parents, but his mother died when he was only two. He was raised in Lyndhurst, New Jersey, and he began performing at the age of fourteen. But success came slowly: by his own account, although he sang and played guitar in a number of clubs, he did not begin to gain a large following for about fifteen years.

Early career
By the early 1940s, he was performing in New York City, and he was also a headliner at several New Jersey clubs.  But when World War II broke out, Monte had to put his career on hold and enlist in the Army. When he was discharged, he resumed playing in clubs, and got a break when he was hired by WAAT AM 970 in Newark, New Jersey in 1948 to do his own show. This offered Monte a chance to refine his act and it helped him to gain a much larger audience. The station rewarded him by convincing its sister TV outlet, WATV/13, to give him some airtime.

Beginning with this exposure, Monte made a couple of recordings on local labels. Joe Carlton was an A&R for RCA Victor Records and heard him performing in a spaghetti joint south of Secaucus. He enjoyed his singing style and the way he accompanied himself on the guitar. He offered him a contract with RCA Victor which lasted seven years. Joe Carlton would go on to start Carlton Records.

Success
Monte's first big hit came in 1954, with the release of his version of "Darktown Strutters' Ball".  In 1962, Monte released his first million-seller song, "Pepino the Italian Mouse", which was awarded a gold disc.  Co-written by Ray Allen and Wandra Merrell and sung alternately in English and a pastiche of Calabrese, "Pepino the Italian Mouse" tells the humorous tale of a mischievous mouse who lives within the walls of a man's home and who pesters him by eating his cheese, drinking his wine and frightening his girlfriend. Arranged by Joe Reisman, who was Monte's longtime collaborator, the single is credited to Don Costa Productions. "Pepino" peaked at number five on [[Billboard Hot 100|Billboards Hot 100]] in mid-January and fared even better in certain markets, including Monte's native New York City, where the single spent two weeks at number one on WABC at the end of December.

The "flip side" of the single featured another Italian-American hybrid novelty song called "What Did Washington Say (When He Crossed The Delaware?)."  The song presumes that George Washington was cold, tired, hungry and without a change of underwear on his famous trip.  At one point in the song, "Washington" complains that the pizzas his wife Martha baked were as "cold as ice".  His solution?  "Sell them to the Indians for only half the price."  He then asks his boatsmen to row faster because "tonight I'm posing for my picture on the dollar bill."

Monte's other famous novelty records include "Dominick the Donkey", a Christmas staple in many Italian-American households and "Pepino's Friend Pasqual (The Italian Pussy-Cat)", the sequel to "Pepino" followed by "Paulucci, the Italian Parrot" and "Paul Revere's Horse (Ba-Cha-Ca-Loop)". "Lazy Mary", a remake of the Italian song "Luna Mezzo Mare", tells the tale of a conversation between a young woman who wishes to be married, and her mother. The somewhat risque song mixes English and Italian verses. The two use double entendre to compare the occupations with the sexual appetites of the various suitors. It peaked at number 12 on the U.S. Pop Singles chart. "Lazy Mary" is routinely played during the seventh inning stretch at New York Mets games (both at Shea Stadium and now at Citi Field), immediately after "Take Me Out To The Ballgame".

"Dominick the Donkey" has enjoyed more recent success in the UK, thanks to its extensive use on The Chris Moyles Show in reference to Newsbeat newsreader and regular show contributor Dominic Byrne during the Christmas season.  During the week leading up to Christmas of 2011, the show suggested or hinted that users download the song from iTunes and Amazon. This led to the song being the number two song on iTunes between December 19–25, 2011. "Dominick the Donkey" reached number 3 in the midweek charts on 21 December 2011, before being confirmed at number 3 in the UK Official Christmas Chart for 2011, only beaten by the X-Factor winners (Little Mix) and a charity record by the Military Wives. Dominic the Donkey did however outsell several rival chart campaigns most notably campaigns supporting Nirvana's rerelease of "Smells Like Teen Spirit", which made number 11, and unsigned YouTube blogger Alex Day, who reached number 4.

A portion of Monte's song "Skinny Lena" has notably been sampled into the They Might Be Giants track "Number Three."

Monte made TV appearances on syndicated programming such as The Mike Douglas Show, The Ed Sullivan Show and the Merv Griffin Show.

Monte resided in Totowa, New Jersey, where his fan club was based. He contributed to the founding of the Lou Monte, Jr., leukemia laboratory at the University of Medicine and Dentistry of New Jersey, in memory of his son who died of the disease at age 21.

Monte's 1971 recording "I Have An Angel In Heaven" was highly popular in the late 1980s and early 1990s satellite radio version of the "Music Of Your Life."

Monte is interred in the Immaculate Conception Cemetery in Upper Montclair, New Jersey. After his death, his surviving son Ray continued to sing his songs in concert for some time. His son is a professional drummer who plays for many bands.

Discography

Singles
 1953 - Jealous of You / Angelina
 1953 - A Baby Cried / One Moment More
 1954 - Darktown Strutters Ball / I Know How You Feel
 1954 - Somewhere There Is Someone / Won't You Forgive Me
 1954 - Chain Reaction / Vera's Veranda
 1954 - Italian Huckle-Buck / Just Like Before
 1954 - When I Hold You In My Arms / In My Dreams
 1954 - Cats Whiskers / Roulette
 1955 - How Important Can It Be / Truly Yours
 1955 - The Italian Wallflower / Dream Boat
 1955 - Bella Notte / With You Beside Me
 1955 - Yaller Yaller Gold / King Of The River
 1955 - Tombolee Tombola / Rosina
 1955 - Santo Natale / Italian Jingle Bells
 1955/60 - The Long Way / Repeat These Words After Me
 1956 - Nina, The Queen of the Teeners / Pony Tail
 1956 - If I Knew You Were Coming I'd've Baked A Cake / Ask Your Heart
 1956 - Elvis Presley For President / If I Was A Millionaire
 1956 - Roman Guitar / Some Cloud Above
 1957 - Calypso Italiano / Someone Else Is Taking You Home
 1957 - Musica Bella / The Wife
 1957 - Ha! Ha! Ha! / Round and Round My Heart
 1958 - Lazy Mary / Angelique
 1958 - Eh Marie, Eh Marie / Sheik of Araby
 1958 - Marianna / Strada 'Nfosa
 1958 - Skinny Lena / Where Do You Work Marie
 1959 - Pizza boy-U.S.A. / The Italian Cowboy Song
 1959 - The Angel in The Fountain / Solo Per Te
 1959 - Pistol Packin` Mama / Have Another
 1959 - All Because it's Christmas / Santa Nicola
 1960 - Remember This Gumba / Guarda Che Luna
 1960 - Darktown Strutters’ Ball / Half A Love
 1960 - Bim Bam Bu / Oh, Oh, Rosie
 1960 - The Huckle-Buck / Always You
 1960 - Dominick The Italian Christmas Donkey / Christmas at Our House
 1960-61 - The Three Italian Bears / Come Prima*
 1961 - A Good Man is Hard to Find / Sixteen Tons
 1961 - Oh! My Pa-Pa, O Mio Papa / Tici Ti Tici To Tici Ta
 1961 - The Sheriff Of Sicily / Katareena
 1962 - Pepino The Italian Mouse / What Did Washington Say (When he Crossed The Delaware)
 1962 - Twist Italiano / Oh Tessie
 1962 - Please Mr. Columbus (Turn the Ship Around) / Addio, Addio
 1963 - Down Little Doggie / La Luna Si Cuole Sposare
 1963 - Pepino's Friend Pasqual (The Italian Pussy-Cat) / I Like You, You Like Me, Eh Paisan
 1963 - Bossa Nova Italiano / Limbo Italiano
 1963 - Paulucci / You're So Smart, You're So Smart, Eh Papa
 1963 - Who Stole My Provolone / Hootennany Italian Style
 1964 - A Baby Cried / Rooster And The Hen
 1964 - Hello Dolly / Jungle Louie
 1964 - Too Fat Polka / You're So Bella Isabella
 1964 - I Want To Hold Your Hand (Italian Style) / My Paisans Across The Way
 1965 - Six O'Clock Supper / Mama Get The Hammer
 1965 - Oh Lonesome Me / Paul Revere's Horse
 1965 - I Know How You Feel / Mixed Up Bull From Palermo
 1965 - No, No Don't Cry, My Love / Don't Wish Your Heartbreak On Me
 1966 - Cheech the Cat / Makin' Whoopee
 1966 - Seventeen / Oh How I Miss You Tonight
 1967 - There'll Be Some Changes Made / When You Get What You Want
 1967 - Digga Digga Baby / A Girl, A Girl
 1967 - I Don't Play With Matches Anymore / All For The Kids*
 1968 - My Wife, The Dancer / Leaky Gondola
 1969 - Goombar Custer's Last Stand / Tattooed Susie
 1972 - I Really Don't Want To Know / I Have An Angel In Heaven
 1972 - She's Got To Be A Saint /
 1976 - Paul Revere's Horse / Jerusalem, Jerusalem
 1977 - Crabs Walk Sideways / Nicolina
 1981 - Shadda Up You Face / Lazy Mary

(*)Promotion release to radio stations only.

EPsLou Monte Sings for You (196x) 
RCA Victor    EPA-4177
 Lazy Mary
 Don't Say Forever
 Mama
 Just Say I Love HerLazy Mary (196x) 
RCA Victor    EPA-5105
 Darktown Strutters Ball
 Lazy Mary
 Eh, Marie! Eh, Marie!
 Italian Huckle BuckLou Monte Darktown Strutters BallRCA Victor  EPA-568 
 A Baby Cried
 One Moment Please
 Darktown Strutters Ball
 Won't You Forgive MePepino, the Italian Mouse & Other Italian Fun Songs (1961)
Reprise # R-6058 EP
 Pepino the Italian Mouse
 Twist Italiano
 What did Washington Say
 Please Mr. Columbus (Turn The Ship Around)
 A Good Man is Hard to Find
 Mala Femmena
 Show Me the Way to Go Home

AlbumsLou Monte Sings for You (1957) 
RCA Victor    LPM 1651 
 Lazy Mary (Luna Mezza Mare)
 Don't Say Forever (O sole mio)
 Just Say I Love Her
 When I Hold You In My Arms
 I Have But One Heart
 Darktown Strutters Ball (Italian Style)
 Mama (Mamma)
 Tango Of Roses (Tango del Rosa)
 Now Is The Time (Torna a Surriento)
 Roman Guitar (Chitarra Romana)
 Non Dimenticar (Don't Forget)
 Italian Huckle-Buck (The Huckle Buck)Here's Lou Monte (1958)
RCA CAMDEN   Cal-455
 Tombolee Tombola
 Bella Notte
 Rosina! (The Menu Song)
 Angelina
 I've Got A Crush On You
 Liza (All the Clouds'll Roll Away)
 Fascinating Rhythm
 Mine
 Jealous Of You (Tango della Gelosia)
 A Baby CriedLou Monte Sings Songs for Pizza Lovers (1958)
RCA Victor    LPM-1877
 The Sheik Of Araby (Italian Style)
 Jealous Of You (Tango Della Gelosia)
 Bony Lena
 Calypso Italiano
 If I Knew You Were Comin' I'd've Baked A Cake (Italian Style)
 Ha! Ha! Ha! (Cha lla La!)
 Eh, Marie! Eh, Marie!
 The Wife (La Mogliera)
 Musica Bella (The Beautiful Music Of Love)
 Angelique
 Round And Round My Heart
 Italian Jingle BellsItalian House Party  (1959)
RCA Victor    LPM 1976
 Hey Gumbaree (Bibadee Bobadee Bu)
 Tell Me You're Mine
 Where Do You Work Marie
 Senza Mama E Nnammurata!
 Solo Perte (Only for You)
 Pizza Boy USA
 The Italian Cowboy Song
 The Angel In The Fountain
 Skinny Lena
 Strada 'Nfosa
 Marianna
 Bella DonnaItaliano USA (1960)
Roulette         R-25126 / SR-25126
 The Huckle-Buck (Italian Style)
 Always You
 Stella D' Amore (Star Of Love)
 Rag Mop
 Half A Love
 Bim Bam Bu (Fruit Store Man)
 Music Goes 'Round And Round
 Tango Della Gelosia
 Innamorata (Sweetheart) from the Paramount film "Artists And Models"*
 (The New) Darktown Strutters' Ball (Italian Style)
 Dawn Of Love (L'Edera)
 Lazy River (Italian Style)Lou Monte Sings the Great Italian American Hits (1961) 
Reprise           R-6005 / R9-6005
 That's Amore
 Sixteen Tons
 Sorrento
 Volare
 Abbracciami
 I'm Walkin'
 A Good Man Is Hard To Find
 Chitarra Romana (Roman Guitars)
 O Sole Mio
 Luna Luna Luna Lu
 Via Veneto
 Comm'e Bella A Stagione (When I Hold You In My Arms)Lou Monte Live!!! In Person (1962)
Reprise          R-6014 / R9-6014
 Just Say I Love Her
 Darktown Strutters Ball
 Roman Guitars (Chitarra Romana)
 Sheik Of Napoli (Sheik of Napoli)
 Lazy Mary
 Mama
 Eh Marie, Eh Marie
 Mala Femina
 Self - Portrait of Lou Monte at Home
 16 Tons
 When I Lost You
 Skinny Lena
 SorrentoPepino, the Italian Mouse & Other Italian Fun Songs (1962)
Reprise          R-6058            LP
 Pepino, the Italian Mouse
 Calypso Italiano
 Oh Tessie
 Tici Ti-Tica To-Tici Ta
 Show Me the Way to Go Home
 What did Washington Say (When He Crossed The Delaware)
 Please Mr. Columbus (Turn The Ship Around)
 A Good Man is Hard to Find
 Eh Marie, Eh Marie
 Sixteen Tons
 Mala Femmena
 Twist ItalianoSpotlight on Lou Monte & Botti-Endor Quartet  (1962) 
SDLP-149     Stereo Spectrum Records / Design Records
 Oh Mari, O' Sole Mio, Oh Mari
 Tell You What I'm Gonna Do
 Oh Baby Kiss Me
 Yesterday's Memories
 Pullechinella
 Americano
 You're Welcome
 Ciao Capri
 If I Could Know
 Funiculi Funicula, Marenariello, Funiculi FuniculaMore Italian Fun Songs From Lou Monte & The Gang (1963)
Reprise           R-6099 / R9-6099
 Pepino's Friend Pasqual (The Italian Pussy-Cat)
 La Luna Si Vuole Sposare
 Pepino's Cha Cha
 Tell Me That You Love Me (Parlami D'Amore Mariu)
 I Like You You Like Me Eh Paisan
 Paulucci (The Italian Parrot)
 Bossa Nova Italiano
 You're So Smart, You're So Smart, Eh Papa
 Arrivederci, Roma
 Tijuana Italiano
 Oh! My Pa-Pa O Mio Papa
 Limbo ItalianoLou Monte's Golden Hits (1964)
Reprise          R-6118 / RS-6118
 Lazy Mary (Luna Mezzo Mare) (LIVE)
 Roman Guitar (Chitarra Romana)
 Pepino The Italian Mouse
 Mama (LIVE)
 Darktown Strutters Ball (LIVE)
 Please Mr. Columbus (Turn The Ship Around)
 The Shiek of Araby (LIVE)
 When I Hold You In My Arms (Comm'a Bella'a Stagione)
 Eh Marie, Eh Marie (LIVE)
 Pepino's Friend Pasqual
 Mala Femmena (LIVE)
 What Did Washington SayThe Mixed-Up Bull from Palermo (1965)
Reprise          R/RS-6155
 The Mixed Up Bull From Palermo
 Think It Over
 My Paisan's Across The Way
 Hootennany Italian Style
 I Know How You Feel
 Skinny Lena
 Hello Dolly (Italian Style)
 You're So Bella, Isabella
 Jungle Louie (The Italian Tarzan)
 Too Fat Polka (Italian Style)
 Who Stole My Provolone
 Down Little DoggieThe Best of Lou Monte (1966)
RCA Victor   LPM 3672 / LSP 3672
 The Darktown Strutters Ball
 Italian Huckle Buck
 Roman Guitars
 Lazy Mary
 Eh Marie, Eh Marie
 The Shiek of Araby
 Just Say I Love Her
 Hey Gumbaree(Bibadee Bobadee Bu)
 When I Hold You In My Arms (Comm'a Bella'a Stagione)
 Skinny Lena
 Calypso ItalianoLou Monte Sings Good Time Songs (1967)
RCA Victor    LPM-3705 /LSP-3705
 Oh How I Miss You Tonight
 By The Light of The Silvery Moon
 The Gang That Sang Heart Of My Heart
 Wedding Bells Are Breaking up That Old Gang Of Mine
 I Wonder Who's Kissing Her Now
 Let The Rest Of The World Go By
 When Your Old Wedding Ring Was New
 What Can I Say After I Say I'm Sorry
 Maybe
 Are You Lonesome Tonight
 That Old Gang Of Mine
 Who's Sorry NowLou Monte, Fun Italian Style (197X)
Tele House     CD-2046       (2-LP set)
Disc One
 Pepino the Italian Mouse
 Eh Marie, Eh Marie
 Sixteen Tons
 Hello Dolly
 Too Fat Polka
 Jungle Louie
 Lazy Mary
 The Sheik of Napoli
 My Paisans Across The Way
 Bossa Nova Italiano
 What Did Washington Say (When He Crossed The Delaware)
 Pepino's Cha Cha Cha
 That's Amore

Disc Two
 Darktown Strutters Ball
 Calypso Italiano
 Paulucci (The Italian Parrot)
 Twist Italiano
 Hootenanny Italian Style
 Tijuana Italiano
 A Good Man is Hard To Find
 Skinny Lena
 I'm Walking
 Think it Over
 Oh TessieTake
 Please Mr. Columbus (Turn The Ship Around)
 Pepino's Friend Pasqual (The Italian Pussy-Cat)Lou Monte Discovers America (1976)
Tele House    CDS-1
 Paul Revere's Horse
 What Did Washington Say
 Please Mr. Columbus
 Skinny Lena
 Nicolena
 Heart of My Heart
 By the Light of the Silvery Moon
 Who's Sorry Now
 That Old Gang of Mine
 Oh How I Miss You Tonight
 Maybe
 Let the Rest of the World Go ByLou Monte's Greatest Hits (1977)
Laurie Records    LES-4005
 Peppino, Jealous of You
 The Sheik of Napoli
 Paul Revere's Horse
 Mama
 Lazy Mary
 Skinny Lena
 Jerusalem, Jerusalem
 Nicolena
 Crabs Walk Sideways
 In My Own Little Way I Pray
 Darktown Strutter's BallShaddap You Face (1981)
AFE Records    AFE-7500
 Shaddap You Face
 Skinny Lena
 Babalucci
 Mama
 Pepino the Italian Mouse
 Darktown Strutters Ball
 Lazy Mary
 Nicolina
 Jealous of You
 The Sheik of ArabyPepino Meets Babalucci (198?)
LSFD Records 
 Babalucci
 Shaddap You Face
 Pepino the Italian Mouse
 Nicolina
 Skinny Lena
 Lazy Mary
 Angel in Heaven
 She's Got to Be a Saint
 Mama
 Mala Femina
 Jealous of You
 Bella Notta

CDsHere's Lou Monte (CD) (1997)
BMG/Special Music # CDA1-0455 (RCA Victor Re-release of the album by the same name)The Very Best Of Lou Monte (1997)
Taragon Records    BMG Special Products (RCA Victor re-release)
TARCD-1030    DRC1-1428Lou Monte Sings Songs for Pizza Lovers/Lou Monte Sings for You  (1999)
Collectable Records Corp. BMG Special Products  (RCA Victor re-release)
COL-CD-2745       DRC1 2333
Songs from(The Album "Songs For Pizza Lovers" was originally released in 1958 as RCA 1877)

(The Album " Lou Monte Sings for You" was originally released in 1958 as RCA 1651)

(Bonus Tracks originally released in 1958 as selections from the Album RCA 1976-"Italian House Party".)Lou Monte The Best Of RCA VICTOR Recordings (2003)
Taragon Records    BMG Special Products (RCA Victor re-release)
TARCD-1101   DRC23075Lou Monte's Golden Hits (2004)
Collectables  COL-CD-6156 (Re-release of the album by the same name)
(Reprise Re-release of the album by the same nameThe Mixed Up Bull From Palermo And Other Italian Fun Songs (2004) Release Collectable COL 6716 (Reprise Re-release of the album by the same name.)Lou Monte Sings for Your...Again (2002) Ronray Records*

 Pepino the Italian Mouse
 She's Got To Be A Saint
 Nicolina
 I Have An Angel In Heaven
 Lazy Mary
 An Old Fashioned Girl
 Cathedral Town
 Skinny Lena
 I Really Don't Want To Know
 Fascinating Rhythm
 I've Got A Crush On You
 Sheik Of Araby
 The Darktown Strutters BallLou Monte's Greatest Hits Part 2'' (2007) Ronray Records*

 Shaddap You Face
 Lazy Mary
 The Sheik of Napoli
 Darktown Strutters Ball
 Jerusalem, Jerusalem
 Babalucci
 Mrs. Brown's Donkey (never before released)
 Darktown Disco
 The Sheik Disco
 In My Own Little Way
Plus 6 more tracks of outtakes.

  *Monte's two surviving sons produced these two CDs

 Recording label history
 RCA Victor 1953-1960
 Jubilee Records 1955-1960?
 Roulette Records 1960-1961
 Reprise Records 1961-1965
 RCA Victor 1965-1967
 Musicor Records 1968
 Regalia Records 1969
 GWP Records 1971
 Jamie Records 1972
 Laurie Records 1976-1977
 AFE Records 1981

Special recordingsSoundtracksTwo musical soundtrack albums were made with various recording artist under "Reprise Musical Repertory Theatre Presents".

Finian's Rainbow Reprise Records - FS 2015 - STEREO
 Overture
 THE HI-LOS - This Time of Year
 ROSEMARY CLOONEY- How Are Things in Glocca Morra?
 DEAN MARTIN & THE HI-LOS - If This Isn't Love
 ROSEMARY CLOONEY - Look to the Rainbow
 BING CROSBY & DEBBIE REYNOLDS - Something Sort of Grandish
 FRANK SINATRA - Old Devil Moon
 SAMMY DAVIS JR - Necessity
 FRANK SINATRA - When I'm Not Near The Girl I Love
 LOU MONTE & THE MARY KAYE TRIO - When The Idle Poor Become The Idle Rich
 THE McGUIRE SISTERS - The Begat
 CLARK DENNIS - How Are Things In Glocca Morra? (Reprise)
 SAMMY DAVIS JR - The Great Come-And-Get-It Day

Kiss Me, Kate "Where Is The Life That Late I Led?"Radio Station Program RecordingsThe Office of Civil Defense and Mobilization recorded a series of record albums entitle "Stars for Defense" 1958–1967.Lou Monte - Speaks side B'''  (Tony Perkins Speaks side A) RCA VICTOR (radio station copy only).
This record was used for commercial breaks with the singer informing the public of the upcoming "News", "Weather", "Time", etc.

References

External links
Official website

1917 births
1989 deaths
American people of Italian descent
American radio personalities
Jubilee Records artists
People from Lyndhurst, New Jersey
RCA Victor artists
Laurie Records artists
Reprise Records artists
20th-century American singers
20th-century American male singers